The 2000–01 Israeli Premier League season had Maccabi Haifa win the title, while Bnei Yehuda and Tzafririm Holon were relegated.

The regular season took place from the first match on 12 August 2000 to the final match on 22 April 2001.
The table was then divided into two groups, the upper and lower, which had six teams each. Then each team played the other five in their group once. The second stage was held between 27 April 2001 and 26 May 2001.

One team from Liga Leumit was promoted at the end of the previous season: Hapoel Tzafririm Holon. The three teams relegated were: Hapoel Kfar Saba, Maccabi Herzliya and Hapoel Jerusalem.

Final table
First 6 teams played in the top playoffs while the last 6 teams played in the bottom playoffs.

Results

First and second round

Third round

Fourth round

Upper Group

Lower Group

Top scorers

See also
2000–01 Toto Cup Al

Israeli Premier League seasons
Israel
1